Sigurd Rudolf Guldbrandsen Bratlie (July 27, 1905 – January 24, 1996) was the leader of Brunstad Christian Church from 1976 until his death in 1996.

Bratlie was born in Nordstrand, Norway and was the youngest of nine children.
A tailor by trade, Bratlie met Johan Oscar Smith at a church service in 1920 while still serving his apprenticeship. He became an influential member, and later leader, of Brunstad Christian Church.  He travelled widely as a missionary and was the subject of international media attention when he was imprisoned for 143 days in Baghdad, Iraq in 1978 for holding Christian meetings.  He was also arrested for conducting missionary activity in Romania in 1974, a country then under the rule of dictator Nicolae Ceaușescu.

Published works
Bratlie wrote numerous articles, mostly published in the Norwegian Christian journal Skjulte Skatter.  He also authored several books, including
The Bride, the Harlot and the End Times, The Grace that is in Christ Jesus, The Gospel of God, So Great a Salvation.
He is also the author of three hymns in Brunstad Christian Church's hymn book Ways of the Lord.

References

1905 births
1996 deaths
Norwegian Christian religious leaders
Brunstad Christian Church
Norwegian Protestant missionaries
Prisoners and detainees of Iraq
Prisoners and detainees of Romania
Norwegian people imprisoned abroad
Protestant missionaries in Iraq
Protestant missionaries in Romania